Erin Hatley is an American beauty pageant titleholder from Bartlett, Tennessee who was named Miss Tennessee 2011.

Biography
She won the title of Miss Tennessee on June 18, 2011, when she received her crown from outgoing titleholder Nicole Jordan. Her competition talent was a vocal rendition of the opera aria "O mio babbino caro." Hatley is a senior at the University of Memphis, majoring in business administration. Hatley was a member of the Gamma Zeta chapter of Alpha Gamma Delta.

References

External links

 
 
 

Year of birth missing (living people)
Living people
American beauty pageant winners
Miss America 2012 delegates
Miss Tennessee winners
People from Bartlett, Tennessee
University of Memphis alumni